Gene Expression Omnibus (GEO) is a database for gene expression profiling and RNA methylation profiling managed by the National Center for Biotechnology Information (NCBI). These high-throughput screening genomics data are derived from microarray or RNA-Seq experimental data. These data need to conform to the minimum information about a microarray experiment (MIAME) format.

Glossary

References

Genetics databases
National Institutes of Health